Ronan Quemener (born February 13, 1988) is a French ice hockey goaltender who is currently playing for Drakkars de Caen of the FFHG Division 1.

Quemener previously played in the Ligue Magnus for Dragons de Rouen, Rapaces de Gap, Brûleurs de Loups, Diables Rouges de Briançon and Boxers de Bordeaux.

Quemener has also played for France at the 2011, 2014, 2015, 2016, 2017 and 2018 IIHF World Championship.

References

External links

1988 births
Living people
French ice hockey goaltenders
Aalborg Pirates players
Asplöven HC players
Boxers de Bordeaux players
Brûleurs de Loups players
Diables Rouges de Briançon players
Dornbirn Bulldogs players
Mikkelin Jukurit players
Rapaces de Gap players
Rouen HE 76 players
French people of Breton descent
Ice hockey people from Paris